Dimitrios Andreadis (born 4 February 1942) is a Greek cross-country skier. He competed in the men's 15 kilometre event at the 1968 Winter Olympics.

References

1942 births
Living people
Greek male cross-country skiers
Olympic cross-country skiers of Greece
Cross-country skiers at the 1968 Winter Olympics